Dacre Kayd Montgomery-Harvey (born 22 November 1994) is an Australian actor. He is known for his roles as Billy Hargrove in the Netflix series Stranger Things (2017–2022), Jason Scott in the 2017 action film Power Rangers, and Steve Binder in 2022 biographical film Elvis. In 2019, he released his own podcast titled "DKMH", which features his own poetry.

Early life
Montgomery was born in Perth, Western Australia, to a Canadian mother Judith Barrett-Lennard and a New Zealander father Scott Montgomery-Harvey. He has one younger sister, Saskia. His parents worked in the screen industry in Australia. Montgomery began performing on screen and in theater at the age of nine. Montgomery attended Mount Lawley Senior High School in his hometown. When Montgomery was in Year 12, his fellow students voted for him to be "The most likely student to become a Hollywood star" in the annual yearbook. Montgomery continued his studies in the dramatic arts throughout his secondary schooling. Montgomery completed his acting degree at the Western Australian Academy of Performing Arts at Edith Cowan University in 2015. In an Instagram post, Dacre said that he was a lost kid. He had a hard time in school, due to the fact he was suffering from anxiety at a young age. He claims he was bullied through his school years due to his weight. He also failed his drama exams in high school. At the age of 18, he was fired from his job, and was told to leave his drama school.

Career
Montgomery's first role came when he appeared in Betrand the Terrible as Fred, in 2010. In 2011, he appeared in a TV Pilot called Family Tree. In 2015, Montgomery appeared in the music video for "Old Souls" by Australian deathcore band Make Them Suffer directed by Jason Eshraghian.

Montgomery starred as Jason Scott, leader of the Power Rangers, in the Power Rangers feature film reboot. The film was released in 2017. Montgomery also appeared in Australian music duo Angus & Julia Stone's music video for their song "Chateau". He also appeared in the sequel to the Australian comedy A Few Best Men, titled A Few Less Men.

In 2017, Montgomery joined the cast for the second season of the Netflix series Stranger Things as character Billy Hargrove. In 2019, he returned for the role in season 3 and a guest role in season 4 in 2022.

On 6 November 2017, Montgomery was announced to be joining The True History of the Kelly Gang based on the novel of the same name by Peter Carey, alongside Russell Crowe and Nicholas Hoult. However, he does not appear in the final film.

On 11 July 2019, he released his own podcast titled "DKMH", which features his own poetry. The description of the podcast states that he spent two years compiling his own poetry and getting "wonderfully talented" musicians to help him "bring it to life".

On 19 October 2022, he was announced to appear in a leading role on 'Went Up the Hill' film co-scripted and directed by Samuel Van Grinsven.

Personal life
Montgomery has been dating model Liv Pollock since 2017. In an Instagram post about an episode of his podcast titled "CONTROL", Dacre talked about having OCD and how it is a condition that both fuels and hinders him.

Filmography

Film

Television

Music videos

Awards and nominations

References

External links

Male actors from Perth, Western Australia
Australian people of Canadian descent
Australian people of New Zealand descent
Living people
1994 births
Australian expatriates in Canada
People educated at Mount Lawley Senior High School
Edith Cowan University alumni